The Bunce is a mystery fiction novel written by Michael de Larrabeiti and published in the United Kingdom in 1980 by Michael Joseph.

Synopsis 
Protagonist Billy Jay is trapped in an insurance related fraud conducted by gangsters, insurance agents, and corrupt police officers.

References

1980 British novels
Novels by Michael de Larrabeiti
Michael Joseph books